The Davis Hills are a small group of hills lying at the south side of Klein Glacier where the latter enters Scott Glacier, in the Queen Maud Mountains. They were mapped by the United States Geological Survey from surveys and by the U.S. Navy in air photos from 1960 to 1963, and were named by the Advisory Committee on Antarctic Names for Parker Davis, a photographer with U.S. Navy Squadron VX-6 in Operation Deep Freeze in 1966 and 1967.

References
 

Hills of Marie Byrd Land